James Lloyd (5 July 1939 – 22 March 2013) was an English boxer. He won a bronze medal in the welterweight division at the 1960 Olympics, losing in the semifinals to the eventual winner Nino Benvenuti. He fought under the names Jim Lloyd and Jimmy Lloyd.

Biography
Lloyd won the 1962 Amateur Boxing Association British light-middleweight title, when boxing for the army. After winning the light middleweight title he turned professional and retired in 1966 with a record of 10 wins, 7 losses and 3 draws.

Lloyd took up boxing aged 9, following his two elder brothers into the sport. In the early 1960s he served and boxed for the British Army and later worked as a mechanic, welder, lorry driver and security guard. In the late 1960's, he co-founded Skelmersdale Amateur Boxing Club with his older brother, Alan Lloyd and for 35 years trained young boxers there. He died of a heart attack, aged 73, and is survived by four children.

References 

1939 births
2013 deaths
Boxers from Liverpool
Olympic boxers of Great Britain
Boxers at the 1960 Summer Olympics
English male boxers
Light-middleweight boxers
Middleweight boxers
Olympic bronze medallists for Great Britain
Olympic medalists in boxing
Medalists at the 1960 Summer Olympics